Give Me the Music  is the second album of Eva Avila, the winner of the fourth season of Canadian Idol. It was released in Canada on October 28, 2008.

Track listing
 "No Smoke" (Alan Ross/David James/John McLaughlin)
 "Wait" (Crispin Hunt/Jade Ewen)
 "Run" (Avila/Adam Crossley/Asher Lenz)
 "Damned" (Greg Johnston/Luke McMaster/Sherry St. Germain/Scott Jacoby)
 "Give Me the Music" (Scott Carter/Damon Hayes/Frankie Storm/Tee Marie/Shawn Johnson)
 "No More Coming Back" (Liz Rodrigues)
 "What I Want (Not What I Need)" (Adam Messinger/Rodrigues)
 "Like a Bullet" (Niara Scarlett/Henrik Korpi/Jens Bergmark/Henrik Franzén)
 "You Don't Say No" (Martin Sutton/Chris Neil/Don Mescall)
 "Master Plan" (James Manners/Hannah Robinson/Silje Haugum Nymoen)
 "Say Goodbye" (Messinger/Nasri Atweh)
 "I'm Sorry" (Audra Mae/Johan Fransson/Tobias Lundgren/Tim Larsson)

iTunes exclusive:

 "My Neighbourhood"

Covers
 "Like a Bullet" and "Master Plan" are cover songs, originally released by Stefanie Heinzmann from Switzerland. Both songs appeared on her debut album Masterplan, with "Like a Bullet" having been the second single released from the album.
 "No Smoke" was originally recorded in 2004 by British singer Michelle Lawson. The song was first covered by Belgian singer Esther Sels in 2008, then called "Game Over." Esther performed it in the second heat of Belgium's Eurosong in 2009. It's also been covered by the German band Queensberry and released as their debut clip following their success on German Popstars in 2008 and Nicki French is too releasing a version of the song on Energise Records in 2009.

Singles
"Give Me the Music" (September 2008) Produced by Dame & Scott of The Matrax
"Damned" (November 2008)
"No More Coming Back" (April 2009)
"No Smoke" (September 2009)

Charts

References

External links
 Eva Avila's Website 
 Eva Avila's MySpace Page

2008 albums
Eva Avila albums
Albums produced by the Messengers (producers)